The J.H. McWilliams House is a historic house at 323 West Oak Street in El Dorado, Arkansas.  This two story brick house was built in 1925–26, during the city's oil boom years.  It is the last surviving house out of a row of "oil boom" mansions which originally lined Oak Street.  The house is built out of buff brick, and has Mediterranean styling.  It was in the McWilliams family until the early 1970s, and then saw a variety of commercial uses, declining in condition.  In the early 2000s it was restored.

The house was listed on the National Register of Historic Places in 2002.

See also
National Register of Historic Places listings in Union County, Arkansas

References

Houses on the National Register of Historic Places in Arkansas
Mediterranean Revival architecture in Arkansas
Houses completed in 1925
Houses in Union County, Arkansas
National Register of Historic Places in Union County, Arkansas
1925 establishments in Arkansas
Buildings and structures in El Dorado, Arkansas